Colobothea chontalensis is a species of beetle in the family Cerambycidae. It was described by Bates in 1872. It is known from Nicaragua and Panama.

References

chontalensis
Beetles described in 1872
Beetles of South America